Gaga: Five Foot Two is a 2017 documentary film about American singer-songwriter Lady Gaga. It documents the events around the production and release of Gaga's fifth studio album, Joanne, and her halftime performance at Super Bowl LI.  The film, directed by visual artist and documentarian Chris Moukarbel, made its debut at the 2017 Toronto International Film Festival before having a worldwide streaming release on Netflix on September 22, 2017. It was also shown during the European leg of Gaga's Joanne World Tour, before each of her shows.

Synopsis
According to Netflix, Gaga: Five Foot Two is of cinéma vérité style, as to give viewers "unfiltered, behind-the-scenes access" to a year in the life of Gaga, during which they cover the production and release of her fifth studio album, Joanne. Many events are covered including her experiences with her entourage, her encounters with fans and her struggle with chronic pain caused by the onset of fibromyalgia. The film also offers an extensive look at the creation and execution of her critically lauded Super Bowl LI halftime performance, in addition to a variety of other topics and events, including her home life, the filming of her guest role as the character Scáthach on American Horror Story: Roanoke, and a discussion about her feud with singer Madonna, among other things.

Cast

Lady Gaga
Angelina Calderone Germanotta, grandmother
Cynthia Germanotta, mother
Joe Germanotta, father
Natali Germanotta, sister
Sonja Durham, Haus of Gaga member and friend
Bobby Campbell, manager
Tony Bennett, musician
Brian Newman, musician
Florence Welch, musician
BloodPop, producer
Mark Ronson, producer
Richy Jackson, choreographer
Frederic Aspiras, hairstylist
Ruth Hogben, filmmaker
Donatella Versace, fashion designer

Critical reception
Gaga: Five Foot Two has received generally favorable reviews from critics. On Rotten Tomatoes, it has an approval rating of 73%, based on 41 reviews, with an average rating of 6.40/10. The website's critical consensus reads, "Gaga: Five Foot Two offers an absorbing glimpse of its superstar subject's backstage life, albeit one weakened by inconsistent focus and a dearth of performance footage." On Metacritic, the film has a weighted average score of 63 out of 100, based on 15 critics, indicating "generally favorable reviews".

Film critic Owen Gleiberman reviewed the documentary for Variety saying that "Gaga radiates a potent energy — she's intensely funny and aware", and compared it to other musical documentaries like Madonna: Truth or Dare (1990). He commended Moukarbel's direction saying that he was able to "mix things up", showcasing Gaga's meltdowns as well as her camaraderie with fans. Leslie Felperin from The Hollywood Reporter complimented the scenes in the documentary like Gaga playing "Joanne" for her grandmother but found that despite all the jarring camerawork, the singer was more focused and scripted about her appearance. Felperin was positive about the technicalities of the film, saying "package is assembled with competence and style, with graceful editing by Greg Arata helping to create a strong sense of story and continuity. Moukarbel and his sound editors frequently use swelling soundtrack choices and a flurry of fast edits to suggest the frenzy of Gaga's life."

Artwork 
The documentary's poster and cover art, featuring rainbow waterfalls, flowers, and an extra eye streaming down Gaga’s face, was created by Berlin-based German artist Pierre Schmidt (aka Drømsjel). Drømsjel's work, characterized by a surreal combination of vintage collage and digital manipulation, attracted the attention of the film's director, Chris Moukarbel, on Instagram. According to Drømsjel, the piece was a collaborative effort between himself, Gaga and her team, Netflix, and Dutch photography duo Inez and Vinoodh, who shot the photo for the cover. The pair have photographed Gaga for a variety of past projects including the singer's cover art for her 2013 single, "Applause". According to Tilly Martin from website Creative Boom, the artwork fits right in with the Drømsjel's signature style which combines collage of vintage fashion imagery with digital manipulation to yield colorful surreal compositions. Along with digital artists Laura Albert, Christophe Remy, and Melissa Murillo, Drømsjel cites Salvador Dalí and Friedrich Nietzsche as major influences on his work.

Accolades

See also
 List of original films distributed by Netflix

References

External links
 
 

2017 documentary films
2017 films
American documentary films
Documentary films about singers
Documentary films about women in music
Lady Gaga
Netflix original documentary films
2010s English-language films
2010s American films